Frank David Young (5 August 1929 – 18 October 2018) was a Canadian rower. He competed in the men's eight event at the 1952 Summer Olympics.

References

1929 births
2018 deaths
Canadian male rowers
Olympic rowers of Canada
Rowers at the 1952 Summer Olympics
Rowers from Toronto